Pointfield is a historic summer estate at 14 Sabine Point Road in Sandwich, New Hampshire.  The main house was designed by J. Randolph Coolidge Jr. and built in 1911 for Natalie Whitwell, who was from a prominent Boston merchant family.  The building has a V-shape with porches at the ends, affording all rooms views of Squam Lake, on whose shores it is located.

The property was listed on the National Register of Historic Places in 2014.

See also
National Register of Historic Places listings in Carroll County, New Hampshire

References

Houses on the National Register of Historic Places in New Hampshire
Houses completed in 1911
Houses in Carroll County, New Hampshire
National Register of Historic Places in Carroll County, New Hampshire
Sandwich, New Hampshire